Trans Island Limousine Service Ltd (a.k.a. TIL) is a subsidiary of Kwoon Chung Bus Company. It is the main cross-boundary bus company in Hong Kong. The company was established in 1973, providing cross boundary coach service between Hong Kong and Guangdong Province, China/Shenzhen International Airport. From 2010, TIL worked with SZIA to provide up-stream check-in services for passengers taking a flight from SZIA in Hong Kong. Up-stream check-in service is available in a number of TIL ticketing centers, including Mong Kok (Prince Edward), Tsim Sha Tsui, Kowloon Tong, Sheung Wan and Shenzhen Bay Port.

Introduction

Coach Service
Trans Island Limousine Service Ltd uses the following brands to provide cross boundary services: 
 Trans Island Chinalink for services from Hong Kong to Guangdong Province, China
 Kwoon Chung Trans Island Shenzhen Airport Link for services from Hong Kong to Shenzhen International Airport.
 GoGo TIL for services from Hong Kong International Airport to Guangdong Province, China and Shenzhen International Airport.

Limousine Service
Inter-Continental Hire Care Ltd was established in 1968 as a subsidiary of Trans Island Limousine Service Ltd. The main business of IHC is providing cross boundary limousine and coach private hiring service, and is branded "Limo Club". It also provides hotel shuttle service from Hong Kong International Airport to most of the hotels in Hong Kong. It is under the brand of "Airport Hotelink". It is the sole operator providing shuttle services to hotels from HKIA.

Routes to Guangdong Province
Stops in Hong Kong:
 Mongkok (Prince Edward)
 Tsim Sha Tsui
 Sheung Wan
 Causeway Bay

Stops in Guangdong:
 Chaoyang
 Foshan
 Guangzhou
 Huadu
 Kaiping
 Shenzhen OCT East
 Panyu District
 Shenzhen Bay Port
 Shenzhen International Airport
 Shunde District
 Taishan
 Nan Ao
 Xinhui
 Yangjiang
 Zhongshan

Route to Shenzhen Bay Port
 From Hong Kong to Shenzhen
 Mongkok (Prince Edward)
 Tsim Sha Tsui
 Sheung Wan
 Causeway Bay
 Ocean Park Hong Kong
 From Shenzhen to Hong Kong drop off point
 Mongkok (Prince Edward)
 Mongkok (Langham Place)
 Yau Ma Tei
 Jordan
 Tsim Sha Tsui (Harbour City)
 Sheung Wan
 Central
 Wan Chai
 Causeway Bay
 Hong Kong Ocean Park
 Hong Kong Disneyland Resort
 Hong Kong International Airport

Route to Shenzhen Airport
 From Hong Kong to Shenzhen
 Mongkok (Prince Edward)
 Tsim Sha Tsui
 Kowloon Tong
 Sheung Wan
 Wan Chai
 Causeway Bay
 Ocean Park Hong Kong
 Shenzhen Bay Port
 Huanggang Port Control Point
 From Shenzhen to Hong Kong drop off point
 Mongkok (Prince Edward)
 Mongkok (Langham Place)
 Yau Ma Tei
 Jordan
 Tsim Sha Tsui (Harbour City)
 Sheung Wan
 Central
 Wan Chai
 Causeway Bay
 Hong Kong Ocean Park
 Hong Kong Disneyland Resort
 Hong Kong International Airport

References

External links
 Trans Island Limousine Service Ltd

Bus transport in Hong Kong